Udyan Kheri railway station is a railway station on Indore–Gwalior line under the Bhopal railway division of West Central Railway zone. This is situated beside National Highway 52 at Udankhedi in Rajgarh district of the Indian state of Madhya Pradesh.

References

Railway stations in Rajgarh district
Bhopal railway division